Sir Robert Boak (died 6 December 1904) was president of the Legislative Council of the Province of Nova Scotia. He was knighted in 1902.

References 

Year of birth missing
1904 deaths
Politics of Nova Scotia
Canadian Knights Bachelor